Another Return is the debut studio album by the Norwegian heavy metal band Artch, released in 1988.

Track listing
All tracks by Artch, except "Conversio Prelude" by Ed Kuczynski

"Conversio Prelude" – 1:02
"Another Return to Church Hill" – 5:28
"Power to the Man" – 3:56
"Loaded" – 4:08
"Where I Go" – 5:58
"Metal Life" – 5:05
"The Promised Land" – 3:42
"Shoot to Kill" – 4:54
"Living in the Past" – 4:26
"Reincarnation" – 4:09

Personnel 
 Eiríkur Hauksson – vocals
 Cato Olsen – guitar
 Geir Nilssen – guitar
 Bernt A. Jansen – bass
 Jørn Jamissen – drums

References

Artch albums
1988 debut albums
Active Records albums